Jean-Luc Correia (born 27 July 1951) is a French rower. He competed in the men's eight event at the 1972 Summer Olympics.

References

1951 births
Living people
French male rowers
Olympic rowers of France
Rowers at the 1972 Summer Olympics
Place of birth missing (living people)